Lesley Dawn Ward (born 1970), is a female former diver who competed for Great Britain and England.

Diving career
Ward represented Great Britain in three Olympic Games; at the 1992 Summer Olympics, 1996 Summer Olympics and the 2000 Summer Olympics.

She represented England in the 10 metres platform, at the 1990 Commonwealth Games in Auckland, New Zealand. Two more appearances ensued in the 1990 Commonwealth Games and the 1998 Commonwealth Games. She was a member of the Highgate Lifebuoys Diving Club.

References

1967 births
Living people
English female divers
Divers at the 1990 Commonwealth Games
Divers at the 1994 Commonwealth Games
Divers at the 1998 Commonwealth Games
Olympic divers of Great Britain
Divers at the 1992 Summer Olympics
Divers at the 1996 Summer Olympics
Divers at the 2000 Summer Olympics
Commonwealth Games competitors for England